Zhang Zhenlin (born 28 January 1999), or Kevin Zhang, is a Chinese professional basketball player for the Liaoning Flying Leopards of the Chinese Basketball Association (CBA). He played college basketball for the Tulane Green Wave.

Early life and high school career
Born in Shenyang, China, Zhang grew up watching National Basketball Association (NBA) players Steve Nash and LeBron James and aspired to play basketball in the United States. In 2013, at age 14, he joined the United States Basketball Academy in Blue River, Oregon upon the advice of his mother's friend, Bruce O'Neil. Zhang spoke no English at the time. In his first three years of high school, he played for La Lumiere School in LaPorte, Indiana, where he played with top recruits Jaren Jackson Jr. and Brian Bowen. Over three seasons at La Lumiere, he helped his team to a combined 82–7 record and the 2017 High School Nationals title.

As a senior, Zhang played for Montverde Academy in Montverde, Florida, helping his team achieve a 35–0 record and win High School Nationals. At the National Prep Showcase in November 2017, he scored 25 points and had five three-pointers against New Hampton School. He was friends with Montverde teammate RJ Barrett, the number one recruit in the 2018 class. On 13 April 2018, Zhang played for Team World at the Nike Hoop Summit. Five days later, he committed to play college basketball for Tulane over offers from UCLA, BYU, DePaul and Kansas State, among other NCAA Division I programs. He was rated a three-star recruit by major recruiting services.

College career
On 11 November 2018, Zhang made his freshman season debut for Tulane, leading his team with 24 points and seven rebounds in an 80–69 loss to 15th-ranked Florida State. After hyperextending his elbow on 8 December versus South Alabama, he sat out his next game against Texas Southern and was limited by the injury in many of his following games. On 13 January 2019, Zhang scored a season-high 25 points in an 83–79 loss to Memphis. As a freshman, he averaged 6.5 points and 2.4 rebounds in 22.5 minutes per game. Tulane finished with a 4–27 record, losing all 18 of its conference games, and Zhang was one of two players to return for the following season amid a roster and coaching overhaul. 

On 4 January 2020, as a sophomore, he scored a season-high 15 points, converting on all five of his three-point attempts, in a 76–71 upset win over Cincinnati. Zhang finished the season averaging 5.1 points and 2.1 rebounds in 19.2 minutes per game.

Professional career
On 19 October 2020, Zhang made his professional debut for the Liaoning Flying Leopards of the Chinese Basketball Association (CBA), recording 13 points and 11 rebounds in a 121–108 win over the Tianjin Pioneers.

On 8 March 2021, Zhang scored a career-high 46 points and 9 rebounds in a 124-115 win over Guangdong Southern Tigers.

National team career
Zhang joined the Chinese national basketball team for training camp in preparation for the 2019 FIBA Basketball World Cup but did not make the final roster.

Zhang was selected into the final roster of Chinese National Basketball Team competing for the FIBA Asian Cup 2021 Qualifiers. 

He was included in China's squad for the 2023 FIBA Basketball World Cup qualification, and had his debut national match against Japan on 28 November, 2021.

Career statistics

College 

|-
| style="text-align:left;"| 2018–19
| style="text-align:left;"| Tulane
| 30 || 16 || 22.5 || .354 || .295 || .757 || 2.4 || .8 || .4 || .4 || 6.5
|-
| style="text-align:left;"| 2019–20
| style="text-align:left;"| Tulane
| 30 || 19 || 19.2 || .410 || .324 || .696 || 2.1 || .5 || .6 || .6 || 5.1
|- class="sortbottom"
| style="text-align:center;" colspan="2"| Career
| 60 || 35 || 20.8 || .377 || .308 || .733 || 2.3 || .6 || .5 || .5 || 5.8

CBA

Regular season 

|-
| style="text-align:left;"| 2020–21
| style="text-align:left;"| Liaoning
| 53 || 43 || 32.3 || .491 || .385 || .705 || 5.6 || 1.5 || 1.2 || .4 || 14.2
|- class="sortbottom"
| style="text-align:center;" colspan="2"| Career
| 53 || 43 || 32.3 || .491 || .385 || .705 || 5.6 || 1.5 || 1.2 || .4 || 14.2

Playoffs 

|-
| style="text-align:left;"| 2020–21
| style="text-align:left;"| Liaoning
| 6 || 4 || 35.8 || .424 || .314 || .500 || 6.2 || 1.2 || 1.5 || .2 || 11.5
|- class="sortbottom"
| style="text-align:center;" colspan="2"| Career
| 6 || 4 || 35.8 || .424 || .314 || .500 || 6.2 || 1.2 || 1.5 || .2 || 11.5

Personal life
Zhang's mother, Wang Fang, played basketball for China at the 1992 Summer Olympics. She won the Women's Chinese Basketball Association (WCBA) title in 2009 while the head coach of the Liaoning Flying Eagles. Wang was a coach for the Chinese women's team at the 2008 Summer Olympics.

References

External links
Tulane Green Wave bio

Living people
1999 births
Chinese men's basketball players
Basketball players from Shenyang
Chinese expatriate basketball people in the United States
Tulane Green Wave men's basketball players
Power forwards (basketball)
La Lumiere School alumni
Montverde Academy alumni